Adolphe de Plevitz State Secondary School is a boys' state secondary school based in Grand-Baie, Mauritius. Students are prepared for the School Certificate and the Higher School Certificate.

History
When it was first inaugurated in 2003 the school was originally named “Royal College, Grand Bay”. However it was later renamed after the renowned French philanthropist and social worker Adolphe de Plevitz who fought for basic working rights of sugar-cane labourers in Mauritius in the 19th century.

Infrastructure
The school is located at Sottise Road, Grand Bay, Mauritius and is opposite Grand Bay Clinic. The school building is square-shaped and has two storeys. It includes 32 Classrooms,     Workshops for technical classes, art rooms, computer laboratory, laboratories for chemistry, physics and biology. There is also a library, staff-room, gymnasium, lecture theatre and multimedia room.

Laureate
Yogesh Koomar Jagessur became the first student of this secondary school to win a scholarship at the Higher School Certificate in the Science field in 2012.

See also
 Education in Mauritius
 List of secondary schools in Mauritius

References 

Boys' schools in Mauritius
Secondary schools in Mauritius
Educational institutions with year of establishment missing